The Martin Berry House is located in Pompton Plains in Pequannock Township, Morris County, New Jersey, United States. The house was built in 1720 and added to the National Register of Historic Places on June 19, 1973. Built by the son of one of the first settlers to the Pompton River region, the pre-Revolutionary War building has been little altered since its construction.

Once the home of Medal of Honor recipient James R. Evans, the home was purchased by Pequannock Township for historic preservation in 2017. The Pequannock Township Historical Society, formed in 2014 and incorporated as a 501(c)(3) nonprofit in 2015, has been tasked with the maintenance of the house.

See also
List of the oldest buildings in New Jersey
Arent Schuyler
National Register of Historic Places listings in Morris County, New Jersey
Martin Berry House website
Pequannock Twp. Historical Society website

References

Houses on the National Register of Historic Places in New Jersey
Houses completed in 1720
Houses in Morris County, New Jersey
National Register of Historic Places in Morris County, New Jersey
New Jersey Register of Historic Places
1720 establishments in New Jersey
Pequannock Township, New Jersey